Riesbach is a district in the Swiss city of Zürich. It is District number 8.

History 
The district comprises the quarters Seefeld, Mühlebach and Weinegg. Riesbach was formerly a municipality of its own, having been incorporated into Zürich in 1893.

Quaianlagen 

As the old bathhouse had to make place for the construction of so-called Seeuferanlage quais, the then independent municipality of Riesbach built the two new bathing facilities Strandbad Tiefenbrunnen (1886) at Zürichhorn and Seebad Utoquai (1890) at Utoquai.

Hafen Riesbach, meaning Riesbach harbour area is situated between Seefeldquai and Blatterwiese. The harbour itself is as the Enge harbour used as a private-owned marina. 2004, the old kiosk at the popular open lido at Riesbachstrasse was replaced by a polygonal pavilion was designed by the architects Andreas Furrimann and Gabrielle Hächler, and now houses a small restaurant. As well as the Seefeldquai, it is part of the historical Quaianlagen, and combines park designs from different design periods. The stone pillar Klausstud originally stood in the lake and served as a border designation of the medieval right of ban of the city republic of Zürich. At that place also ended the fishing rights of the urban fishermen, and from here the Einsiedeln Abbey pilgrims proved their honour to the Protestantic city by lowering the volume of their prayers and songs. Since the landfills in the construction of the quais, the pillar stands in the middle of the park. The sculpture by Henry Moore is named Sheep Piece, and was donated in 1976. The Centre Le Corbusier or Heidi Weber Museum, an art museum dedicated to the work of the Swiss architect Le Corbusier, is situated between Seefeldquai and Blatterwiese. Between Blatterwiese and Bellerivestrasse, in 1993 the Chinese Garden Zürich was inaugurated.

Gallery

References 

District 8 of Zürich